Vicharnnoi Porntawee (January 25, 1948 – January 31, 2022) was a Thai Muay Thai kickboxer who competed in the 1970s. He was recognized as one of the greatest Muay Thai fighters of all time.

Life and career
Vicharnnoi (or Wichannoi) was born in 1948, he grew up in the Nonthaburi province of Thailand where he started Muay Thai training around the age of 12. His first fights were for the Srimuangnon camp; he used the ring names "Vicharnnoi Luktalatkwan" and "Vicharnnoi Srimuangnon" (วิชาญน้อย ศรีเมืองนนท์) during that period. Vicharnnoi then moved to the Porntawee camp in the Buriram province.

In the ring Vicharnnoi relied primarily on his hands, throwing long and powerful boxing combinations, he also was a prolific low kicker. With the use of a long guard and extreme composure he could keep a tight defense. He had a high fight IQ, studying opponents, adapting his techniques and timing to disarm a variety of styles. This allowed him to compete into his 30s at the highest level, earning him the nickname "The Immortal". He is one of the most respected Muay Thai fighters of all time by his peers.

Vicharnnoi had over 200 fights during his career and faced the most fearsome fighters of his era such as Saensak Muangsurin, Pudpadnoi Worawut, Dieselnoi Chor Thanasukarn, Poot Lorlek, Padejsuk Pitsanurachan, Posai Sitiboonlert, Sirimongkol Luksiripat or Nongkhai Sor.Prapatsorn. His best purses reached 250,000 baht.

In 1975 Vicharnnoi faced Poot Lorlek, this fight became the first in Muay Thai history to reach a gate of 1 million baht. They received the award of Fight of the Year for their battle.

After his retirement from competition Vicharnnoi owned a beverage delivery company and stayed in the Muay Thai sphere by sponsoring fighters who then fought under the name "Vicharnnoi Store". He was very implicated with the community of his native province where he was involved in the municipal association.

Vicharnnoi died from renal failure complications on January 31, 2022, at the age of 74.

Titles and accomplishments
 1967 Lumpinee Stadium 112 lbs Champion (defended once)
 1968 Rajadamnern Stadium 112 lbs Champion (defended once)
 1974 Rajadamnern Stadium 130 lbs Champion (defended four times)

Awards
 1975 Fight of the Year (vs Poot Lorlek)
 1977 Sports Writers Association Fighter of the Year
 1980 Fight of the Year (vs Dieselnoi Chor Thanasukarn)
 2014 Siam Sport Hall of Fame (Muay Thai)

Muay Thai record

|-  style="background:#fbb;"
| 1980-08-14 || Loss||align=left| Kengkaj Kiatkriangkrai || Rajadamnern Stadium || Bangkok, Thailand || Decision || 5 || 3:00

|-  style="background:#fbb;"
| 1980-07-14 || Loss||align=left| Nongkhai Sor.Prapatsorn|| Rajadamnern Stadium || Bangkok, Thailand || Decision || 5 || 3:00

|-  style="background:#fbb;"
| 1980-05-03 || Loss||align=left| Kaopong Sitichuchai||  || Rayong Province, Thailand || TKO || 2 || 

|-  style="background:#fbb;"
| 1980-03-05 || Loss||align=left| Padejsuk Pitsanurachan|| Rajadamnern Stadium || Bangkok, Thailand || Decision || 5 || 3:00

|-  style="background:#fbb;"
| 1980-01-22 || Loss||align=left| Dieselnoi Chor Thanasukarn || Lumpinee Stadium || Bangkok, Thailand || Decision || 5 || 3:00
|-
! style=background:white colspan=9 |

|-  style="background:#cfc;"
| 1979-10-09 || Win||align=left| Pannoi Sakornphithak|| Lumpinee Stadium || Bangkok, Thailand || Decision || 5 || 3:00

|-  style="background:#cfc;"
| 1979-07-02 || Win||align=left| Padejsuk Pitsanurachan|| Rajadamnern Stadium || Bangkok, Thailand || Decision || 5 || 3:00

|-  style="background:#fbb;"
| 1979-05-11 || Loss ||align=left| Khaosod Sitpraprom || Rajadamnern Stadium || Bangkok, Thailand || Decision || 5 || 3:00

|-  style="background:#cfc;"
| 1979-03-03 || Win ||align=left| Posai Sitiboonlert || Lumpinee Stadium || Bangkok, Thailand || Decision || 5 || 3:00

|-  style="background:#cfc;"
| 1979-01-17 || Win ||align=left| Dieselnoi Chor Thanasukarn || Rajadamnern Stadium || Bangkok, Thailand || Decision || 5 || 3:00

|-  style="background:#fbb;"
| 1978-12-05 || Loss ||align=left| Padejsuk Pitsanurachan|| Rajadamnern Stadium || Bangkok, Thailand || Decision || 5 || 3:00

|-  style="background:#cfc;"
| 1978-10-12 || Win ||align=left| Dieselnoi Chor Thanasukarn || Rajadamnern Stadium || Bangkok, Thailand || Decision || 5 || 3:00
|-
! style=background:white colspan=9 |

|-  style="background:#cfc;"
| 1978-08-05 || Win ||align=left| Narongnoi Kiatbandit ||  || Hat Yai, Thailand || Decision || 5 || 3:00

|-  style="background:#fbb;"
| 1978-06-02 || Loss ||align=left| Narongnoi Kiatbandit || Wilfredo Gomez vs Sagat Porntawee|| Nakhon Ratchasima, Thailand || Decision || 5 || 3:00
|-
! style=background:white colspan=9 |

|-  style="background:#cfc;"
| 1978-05-04 || Win ||align=left| Posai Sitiboonlert || Rajadamnern Stadium || Bangkok, Thailand || Decision || 5 || 3:00

|-  style="background:#fbb;"
| 1978-02-24 || Loss ||align=left| Jitti Muangkhonkaen || Lumpinee Stadium || Bangkok, Thailand || Decision || 5 || 3:00

|-  style="background:#cfc;"
| 1977-12-08 || Win||align=left| Narongnoi Kiatbandit || Rajadamnern Stadium || Bangkok, Thailand || Decision || 5 || 3:00
|-
! style=background:white colspan=9 |
|-  style="background:#fbb;"
| 1977-10-27 || Loss ||align=left| Nongkhai Sor.Prapatsorn ||  || Bangkok, Thailand || Decision || 5 || 3:00

|-  style="background:#cfc;"
| 1977-09-23 || Win ||align=left| Wichit Lookbangplasoi || Lumpinee Stadium || Bangkok, Thailand || Decision || 5 || 3:00

|-  style="background:#cfc;"
| 1977-08-25 || Win||align=left| Neth Saknarong ||  || Bangkok, Thailand || Decision || 5 || 3:00

|-  style="background:#fbb;"
| 1977-06-02 || Loss ||align=left| Narongnoi Kiatbandit || Rajadamnern Stadium || Bangkok, Thailand || Decision || 5 || 3:00

|-  style="background:#cfc;"
| 1977-04-28 || Win ||align=left| Nongkhai Sor.Prapatsorn || Rajadamnern Stadium || Bangkok, Thailand || Decision || 5 || 3:00
|-
! style=background:white colspan=9 |

|-  style="background:#fbb;"
| 1977-01-28 || Loss ||align=left| Bundit Singprakarn || Rajadamnern Stadium || Bangkok, Thailand || Decision || 5 || 3:00

|-  style="background:#cfc;"
| 1976-12-15 || Win||align=left| Narongnoi Kiatbandit || Rajadamnern Stadium || Bangkok, Thailand || Decision || 5 || 3:00
|-
! style=background:white colspan=9 |

|-  style="background:#fbb;"
| 1976-11-11 || Loss ||align=left| Neth Saknarong || Rajadamnern Stadium || Bangkok, Thailand || Decision || 5 || 3:00

|-  style="background:#fbb;"
| 1976-09-27 || Loss||align=left| Jitti Muangkhonkaen || Rajadamnern Stadium || Bangkok, Thailand || Decision || 5 || 3:00

|-  style="background:#cfc;"
| 1976-08-18 || Win ||align=left| Jocky Sitkanpai || Rajadamnern Stadium || Bangkok, Thailand || Decision || 5 || 3:00

|-  style="background:#cfc;"
| 1976-07-15 || Win ||align=left| Posai Sitiboonlert ||Rajadamnern Stadium || Bangkok, Thailand || Decision || 5 || 3:00
|-
! style=background:white colspan=9 |

|-  style="background:#fbb;"
| 1976-05-27 || Loss ||align=left| Pudpadnoi Worawut || Rajadamnern Stadium || Bangkok, Thailand || Decision || 5 || 3:00

|-  style="background:#cfc;"
| 1976-03-04 || Win ||align=left| Khunponnoi Kiatsuriya || Rajadamnern Stadium || Bangkok, Thailand || Decision || 5 || 3:00

|-  style="background:#cfc;"
| 1976-02-12 || Win ||align=left| Narongnoi Kiatbandit || Rajadamnern Stadium || Bangkok, Thailand || Decision || 5 || 3:00
|-
! style=background:white colspan=9 |

|-  style="background:#cfc;"
| 1975-11-12 || Win||align=left| Neth Saknarong || Rajadamnern Stadium || Bangkok, Thailand || Decision || 5 || 3:00

|-  style="background:#fbb;"
| 1975-08-29 || Loss||align=left| Wichit Lookbangplasoi || Lumpinee Stadium || Bangkok, Thailand || Decision || 5 || 3:00

|-  style="background:#fbb;"
| 1975-07-25 || Loss ||align=left| Bundit Singprakarn || Lumpinee Stadium || Bangkok, Thailand || Decision || 5 || 3:00

|-  style="background:#fbb;"
| 1975-06-19 ||Loss ||align=left| Poot Lorlek || Rajadamnern Stadium || Bangkok, Thailand || Decision || 5 || 3:00

|-  style="background:#cfc;"
| 1975-01-23 || Win ||align=left| Bangmod Lookbangko || Rajadamnern Stadium || Bangkok, Thailand || Decision || 5 || 3:00

|-  style="background:#cfc;"
| 1974-11-22 || Win ||align=left| Khunponnoi Kiatsuriya || Lumpinee Stadium || Bangkok, Thailand || Decision || 5 || 3:00

|-  style="background:#fbb;"
| 1974-08-22 || Loss ||align=left| Saensak Muangsurin || Rajadamnern Stadium || Bangkok, Thailand || KO || 3 ||

|-  style="background:#cfc;"
| 1974-07-24 ||Win ||align=left| Wannarong Peeramit ||  || Bangkok, Thailand || Decision || 5 || 3:00

|-  style="background:#cfc;"
| 1974-05-23 ||Win ||align=left| Khunponnoi Kiatsuriya || Rajadamnern Stadium || Bangkok, Thailand || Decision || 5 || 3:00

|-  style="background:#cfc;"
| 1974-04-09 || Win||align=left| Somsak Sor Thewasoonthon || Lumpinee Stadium || Bangkok, Thailand || KO || 2 || 

|-  style="background:#fbb;"
| 1974-03-01 || Loss ||align=left| Pudpadnoi Worawut || Lumpinee Stadium || Bangkok, Thailand || Decision || 5 || 3:00

|-  style="background:#cfc;"
| 1974-01-21 ||Win ||align=left| Saifah Saengmorakot || Rajadamnern Stadium || Bangkok, Thailand || Decision || 5 || 3:00
|-
! style=background:white colspan=9 |

|-  style="background:#fbb;"
| 1973-10-26 || Loss ||align=left| Sirimongkol Luksiripat|| Lumpinee Stadium || Bangkok, Thailand || Decision || 5 || 3:00

|-  style="background:#fbb;"
| 1973-09-07|| Loss ||align=left| Khunpon Sakornpitak || Huamark Stadium || Bangkok, Thailand || Decision || 5 || 3:00

|-  style="background:#fbb;"
| 1973-07-25 || Loss ||align=left| Khunpon Sakornpitak || Lumpinee Stadium || Bangkok, Thailand || Decision || 5 || 3:00

|-  style="background:#cfc;"
| 1973-06-22 || Win ||align=left| Huasai Sithiboonlert || Lumpinee Stadium || Bangkok, Thailand || KO (Punches)|| 2 ||

|-  style="background:#cfc;"
| 1973-05-17 || Win||align=left| Sichang Sakornphithak || Huamark Stadium || Bangkok, Thailand || KO || 4 || 

|-  style="background:#fbb;"
| 1973-04-03 || Loss ||align=left| Huasai Sithiboonlert || Lumpinee Stadium || Bangkok, Thailand || Decision || 5 || 3:00

|-  style="background:#cfc;"
| 1973-02-09 || Win ||align=left| Pansak Kiatcharoenchai || Lumpinee Stadium || Bangkok, Thailand || Referee stoppage|| 3 || 

|-  style="background:#fbb;"
| 1972-12-15 || Loss ||align=left| Pansak Kiatcharoenchai || Lumpinee Stadium || Bangkok, Thailand || Decision || 5 || 3:00

|-  style="background:#cfc;"
| 1972-11-06 || Win ||align=left| Wisan Kraikriengyuk || Lumpinee Stadium || Bangkok, Thailand || KO || 4 ||

|-  style="background:#cfc;"
| 1972-09-29 || Win ||align=left| Saensak Muangsurin || Huamark Stadium || Bangkok, Thailand || Decision || 5 || 3:00

|-  style="background:#cfc;"
| 1972-09-01 || Win ||align=left| Buriram Sun Misakawan || Lumpinee Stadium || Bangkok, Thailand || Decision || 5 || 3:00

|-  style="background:#fbb;"
| 1972-08-01 || Loss ||align=left| Saensak Muangsurin || Lumpinee Stadium || Bangkok, Thailand || Decision || 5 || 3:00

|-  style="background:#cfc;"
| 1972-06-09 || Win ||align=left| Denthoranee Muangsurin || Lumpinee Stadium || Bangkok, Thailand || Decision || 5 || 3:00

|-  style="background:#cfc;"
| 1972-04-25 || Win ||align=left| Poot Lorlek || Lumpinee Stadium || Bangkok, Thailand || Decision || 5 || 3:00

|-  style="background:#fbb;"
| 1972-03-01 || Loss ||align=left| Muangchon Jeeraphan||  || Bangkok, Thailand || Decision || 5 || 3:00

|-  style="background:#fbb;"
| 1972-01-31 || Loss ||align=left| Sirimongkol Luksiripat ||  || Bangkok, Thailand || Decision || 5 || 3:00

|-  style="background:#cfc;"
| 1971-12-17 || Win ||align=left| Pudpadnoi Worawut || Lumpinee Stadium || Bangkok, Thailand || KO || 3 ||

|-  style="background:#cfc;"
| 1971-11-05 || Win ||align=left| Poot Lorlek || Lumpinee Stadium || Bangkok, Thailand || Decision || 5 || 3:00

|-  style="background:#cfc;"
| 1971-10-06 ||Win ||align=left| Chaiyut Sitboonlert || Rajadamnern Stadium || Bangkok, Thailand || Decision || 5 || 3:00

|-  style="background:#cfc;"
| 1971-07-01 ||Win ||align=left| Chansuk Lukratchakru || Rajadamnern Stadium || Bangkok, Thailand || Decision || 5 || 3:00

|-  style="background:#fbb;"
| 1971-03-01 || Loss||align=left| Singhao Sor.Lukpithak || Rajadamnern Stadium || Bangkok, Thailand || Referee Stoppage|| 5 ||

|-  style="background:#cfc;"
| 1971-01-27 ||Win ||align=left| Norasing Sida || Rajadamnern Stadium || Bangkok, Thailand || Decision || 5 || 3:00

|-  style="background:#cfc;"
| 1970-11-11 ||Win ||align=left| Rittisak Sornram || Rajadamnern Stadium || Bangkok, Thailand || Decision || 5 || 3:00

|-  style="background:#c5d2ea;"
| 1970-09-01 || No Contest||align=left| Fahsai Taweechai || Lumpinee Stadium || Bangkok, Thailand || || 3 ||
|-
! style=background:white colspan=9 |

|-  style="background:#cfc;"
| 1970-08-07 || Win||align=left| Taweechai Ludchon || Lumpinee Stadium || Bangkok, Thailand || Decision || 5 || 3:00

|-  style="background:#cfc;"
| 1970-06-19 ||Win ||align=left| Saifah Saengmorakot || Lumpinee Stadium || Bangkok, Thailand || TKO || 3 ||

|-  style="background:#fbb;"
| 1970-04-29 || Loss ||align=left| Sirimongkol Luksiripat || Lumpinee Stadium || Bangkok, Thailand || Decision || 5 || 3:00

|-  style="background:#cfc;"
| 1970-04-06 ||Win ||align=left| Singhao Sor.Lukpithak || Charusathian Stadium || Bangkok, Thailand || Referee Stoppage|| 5 ||

|-  style="background:#cfc;"
| 1970-03-09 ||Win ||align=left| Wehat Napapol || Rajadamnern Stadium || Bangkok, Thailand || Decision || 5 || 3:00

|-  style="background:#cfc;"
| 1970-02-17 ||Win ||align=left| Hongfa Itthinuchit || Lumpinee Stadium || Bangkok, Thailand || Decision || 5 || 3:00

|-  style="background:#cfc;"
| 1969-08-08 ||Win ||align=left| Norasing Isaraphap || Lumpinee Stadium || Bangkok, Thailand || Decision || 5 || 3:00

|-  style="background:#cfc;"
| 1969-07-04 ||Win ||align=left| Saifah Saengmorakot || Lumpinee Stadium || Bangkok, Thailand || Decision || 5 || 3:00

|-  style="background:#cfc;"
| 1969-04-08 ||Win ||align=left| Adulsak Itthinuchit|| Lumpinee Stadium || Bangkok, Thailand || Decision || 5 || 3:00

|-  style="background:#cfc;"
| 1969-03-08 ||Win ||align=left| Plaidet Kaewsuriya||  || Nonthaburi province, Thailand || KO || 4 ||

|-  style="background:#cfc;"
| 1969-02-17 ||Win ||align=left| Jomkitti Singpaniang|| Rajadamnern Stadium || Bangkok, Thailand || Decision || 5 || 3:00
|-
! style=background:white colspan=9 |

|-  style="background:#cfc;"
| 1968-11-10 ||Win ||align=left| Chansak Sornsaksit || Charusathian Stadium || Bangkok, Thailand || Decision || 5 || 3:00

|-  style="background:#cfc;"
| 1968-09-18 ||Win ||align=left| Kiatpatum Dejpaisan || Rajadamnern Stadium || Bangkok, Thailand || Decision || 5 || 3:00
|-
! style=background:white colspan=9 |

|-  style="background:#cfc;"
| 1968-08-20 || Win ||align=left| Yodchai Amornrat || Lumpinee Stadium || Bangkok, Thailand || Decision || 5 || 3:00

|-  style="background:#fbb;"
| 1968-06-08 ||Loss ||align=left| Chansak Sornsaksit || Rajadamnern Stadium || Bangkok, Thailand || Decision || 5 || 3:00

|-  style="background:#fbb;"
| 1968-05-06 ||Loss ||align=left| Ritthichai Lukkaojao || Rajadamnern Stadium || Bangkok, Thailand || Decision || 5 || 3:00
|-
! style=background:white colspan=9 |

|-  style="background:#c5d2ea;"
| 1968-04-05 || Draw||align=left| Samingthong Jeeraphan || Chanthanimit Shopping Center || Chanthaburi province, Thailand || Decision || 5 || 3:00
|-
! style=background:white colspan=9 |

|-  style="background:#cfc;"
| 1968-01-29 || Win ||align=left| Sanit Sor Subin ||  || Chiang Mai, Thailand || KO || 2 ||

|-  style="background:#cfc;"
| 1967-10-31 || Win||align=left| Samingthong Jeeraphan || Lumpinee Stadium || Bangkok, Thailand || Decision || 5 || 3:00
|-
! style=background:white colspan=9 |

|-
| colspan=9 | Legend:

See more
List of Muay Thai practitioners

References

1948 births
2022 deaths
Vicharnnoi Porntawee
Vicharnnoi Porntawee
Deaths from kidney failure